The Moskvitch 404 Sport was a prototype sports car from Soviet manufacturer Moskvitch introduced in 1954.

It was based on the Moskvitch 400/420 and used a new, experimental overhead valve hemi engine, with a compression ratio of 9.2:1, which produced . The car was quite successful in racing and won three Soviet Championships.

Notes 

Sports cars
404 Sport
Motorsport in the Soviet Union
Racing cars
Cars of Russia
Soviet automobiles
Cars introduced in 1954